Ja'Quan McMillian (born June 4, 2000) is an American football cornerback for the Denver Broncos of the National Football League (NFL). He played college football at East Carolina University and was signed by the Broncos as an undrafted free agent in 2022.

College career
McMillian was a semi-finalist for the Jim Thorpe Award and earned earned second-team All-American honors for his 2021 season. He also earned second-team all-AAC honors for his 2020 and 2021 seasons.

Professional career
After going unselected in the 2022 NFL Draft, the Denver Broncos signed McMillian as an undrafted free agent. He was waived at the final roster cuts, on August 30, 2022. The Broncos signed him to their practice squad the next day, where he remained until January 3, 2023, when he was elevated to the active roster. McMillian made his professional debut 5 days later as a starter in the Broncos' week 18 matchup against the Los Angeles Chargers, in which he played every defensive snap.

References

External links
 Denver Broncos bio
 East Carolina Pirates bio

2000 births
Living people
American football cornerbacks
Players of American football from North Carolina
Sportspeople from Winston-Salem, North Carolina
East Carolina Pirates football players
Denver Broncos players